Phytomyza opacae is a species in the family Agromyzidae ("leaf miner flies"), in the order Diptera ("flies"). Its host plants are Ilex myrtifolia, Ilex cassine, Ilex opaca, and Ilex amelanchier.

References

Further reading

External links
Diptera.info
NCBI Taxonomy Browser, Phytomyza opacae

Phytomyza
Insects of the United States
Insects described in 1968